Esporte Clube União Suzano, commonly known as ECUS, is a Brazilian football and volleyball club based in Suzano, São Paulo state. The men's volleyball team won the Superliga Brasileira de Voleibol once.

History
The club was founded on October 25, 1993.

Football
They won the Campeonato Paulista Série B2 in 2002.

Volleyball
ECUS men's team, adopting the name Report/Suzano, won the Superliga Brasileira de Voleibol in the 1996-1997 season.

Achievements

Football
 Campeonato Paulista Série B2:
 Winners (1): 2002

Volleyball
 Superliga Brasileira de Voleibol:
 Winners (1): 1996-1997

Stadium
Esporte Clube União Suzano play their home games at Estádio Francisco Marques Figueira, nicknamed Suzanão. The stadium has a maximum capacity of 3,445 people.

References

Association football clubs established in 1993
Football clubs in São Paulo (state)
Volleyball clubs in São Paulo (state)
1993 establishments in Brazil
Brazilian volleyball clubs